Signature Theatre may refer to:

 Signature Theatre (Arlington, Virginia), a stage theater in Virginia
 Signature Theatre Company, a stage theater in New York
 Signature Theatres, a chain of movie theaters bought and rebranded by the Regal Entertainment Group in 2004